The Gibraltar National Archives is a department of the Government of Gibraltar under the responsibility of the Ministry of the Deputy Chief Minister of Gibraltar.

The Gibraltar Archives were established in 1969 following Gibraltar's first constitution. The institution is responsible not only for the collection and preservation of public records, but for providing access to the records that may be released to the public and to academic researchers in those cases where records can be released.

Besides public records, historical records from the 16th, 17th, 18th, 19th, 20th and 21st centuries are also deposited in the Gibraltar National Archives. Such records were donated for bodies and institutions that took part in any way in the administration of Gibraltar. Private individuals, groups and associations have also donated records to the Gibraltar National Archives. An example is the Gibraltar branch of the Transport and General Workers' Union (TGWU, now Unite the Union), who did it in 2008.

See also
 Gibraltar Museum

References

External links
Gibraltar Archives in the Government of Gibraltar Information Services
Gibraltar National Archives Website

Government of Gibraltar
Gibraltar
History of Gibraltar
Buildings and structures in Gibraltar
Gibraltarian culture